Sophie's Choice is a 1982 drama film directed and written by Alan J. Pakula, adapted from William Styron's 1979 novel Sophie's Choice. The film stars Meryl Streep as Zofia "Sophie" Zawistowski, a Polish immigrant to America with a dark secret from her past who shares a boarding house in Brooklyn with her tempestuous lover Nathan (Kevin Kline in his first feature film), and young writer Stingo (Peter MacNicol). It also features Rita Karin, Stephen D. Newman and Josh Mostel.

Sophie's Choice premiered in Los Angeles on December 8, 1982, and was theatrically released on December 10 by Universal Pictures. It received generally positive reviews from critics and grossed $30 million.

Streep's titular performance was almost unanimously praised. The film received five nominations at the 55th Academy Awards, for Best Adapted Screenplay, Best Cinematography, Best Costume Design and Best Original Score, with Streep winning the award for Best Actress.

Plot
In 1947, Stingo moves to Brooklyn to write a novel and is befriended by neighbors Sophie Zawistowska, a Polish immigrant, and her emotionally unstable lover, Nathan Landau.

Nathan is constantly jealous and, when he is in one of his violent mood swings, he convinces himself that Sophie is unfaithful, and he abuses and harasses her. A flashback shows how Nathan first met Sophie after her immigration to the U.S. when she collapsed from severe anemia.

Sophie tells Stingo before she came to the U.S., her husband and father were killed in a German work camp, and she was interned in Auschwitz. Stingo later learns from a college professor Sophie's father was a Nazi sympathizer. When Stingo confronts Sophie with this, she admits the truth.

Sophie explains that after her father (a university professor) and her husband (her father's assistant) were taken away by the Nazis, she had a war-time lover, Józef. He lived with his half-sister, Wanda, and was a leader in the Resistance. Wanda tried to convince Sophie to translate some stolen Gestapo documents, but Sophie declined, fearing she might endanger her two children Jan and Eva.

Two weeks later, Józef was murdered by the Gestapo and Sophie was arrested and sent to Auschwitz with the children. After arrival, Sophie was assigned as Rudolph Höss' secretary due to her language and office skills.

Nathan tells Sophie and Stingo he is doing groundbreaking research at Pfizer, but Nathan's physician brother tells Stingo that Nathan has paranoid schizophrenia and all of the schools Nathan claimed to attend were actually expensive "funny farms". Nathan is not a biologist as he claims. He does have a job at Pfizer, which his brother obtained for him, but it is in the library, and he only occasionally assists with research.

After Nathan believes Sophie has betrayed him again, he calls her and Stingo on the phone and fires a gun in a violent rage. Sophie and Stingo flee to a hotel, and he plans for a future for the two of them. She agrees to be with him but not to marry because she considers herself an unfit mother. Upon arrival at Auschwitz, she had been forced to choose one of her children to be sent to the gas chamber if not both would be, so she chose Eva.

Sophie and Stingo make love. Then while he is sleeping, she leaves a note, returning to Nathan. Sophie and Nathan die by suicide together by taking cyanide. Stingo recites the poem "Ample Make This Bed" from a book by Emily Dickinson, the American poet Sophie was fond of reading, that she left on her bed.

Stingo moves to a small farm his father recently inherited in southern Virginia to finish writing his novel.

Cast

Production
Styron wrote the novel with Ursula Andress in mind for the part of Sophie, and the Slovak actress Magdaléna Vášáryová was also considered. Streep was very determined to get the role. After obtaining a bootlegged copy of the script, she went after Pakula, and threw herself on the ground, begging him to give her the part. Pakula's first choice was Liv Ullmann, for her ability to project the foreignness that would add to her appeal in the eyes of an impressionable, romantic Southerner.

The film was mostly shot in New York City, with Sophie's flashback scenes shot afterwards in Zagreb, Yugoslavia. Production for the film, at times, was more like a theatrical set than a film set. Pakula allowed the cast to rehearse for three weeks, and was open to improvisation from the actors, "spontaneous things", according to Streep.

Release
The film had its premiere at the Samuel Goldwyn Theater in Los Angeles on Wednesday, December 8, 1982, and then opened on December 10 in nine theatres in New York City (Cinema 1 and 3), Los Angeles (Avco 2), San Francisco, San Jose, Chicago, Dallas, Washington D.C. and Toronto.

Reception

Critical reception
Sophie's Choice received positive reviews. On the review aggregator website Rotten Tomatoes, it holds a 78% rating based on 41 reviews, with an average score of 7.00/10. The consensus reads, "Sophie's Choice may be more sobering than stirring, but Meryl Streep's Oscar-winning performance holds this postwar period drama together." On Metacritic, the film has a 68 out of 100 rating based on nine critics, signifying "generally favorable reviews".

Roger Ebert of the Chicago Sun-Times gave the film four out of four stars, calling it "a fine, absorbing, wonderfully acted, heartbreaking movie. It is about three people who are faced with a series of choices, some frivolous, some tragic. As they flounder in the bewilderment of being human in an age of madness, they become our friends, and we love them".

Gene Siskel of The Chicago Tribune gave the film three-and-a-half stars out of four, finding it "not as powerful or as involving" as the novel but praising Streep for a "striking performance".

Janet Maslin of The New York Times wrote, "Though it's far from a flawless movie, 'Sophie's Choice' is a unified and deeply affecting one. Thanks in large part to Miss Streep's bravura performance, it's a film that casts a powerful, uninterrupted spell."

Gary Arnold of The Washington Post wrote, "There is greatness in the extraordinary performances of Meryl Streep, Kevin Kline and Peter MacNicol, who endow the principal characters of 'Sophie's Choice' with appealing, ultimately heartbreaking individuality and romantic glamor."

Not all reviews were positive. Todd McCarthy at Variety called it "a handsome, doggedly faithful and astoundingly tedious adaptation of William Styron's best-seller. Despite earnest intentions and top talent involved, lack of chemistry among the three leading players and over-elaborated screenplay make this a trying experience to sit through."

Sheila Benson of the Los Angeles Times wrote, "Although many of the book's characters have been cut away, and with them some of its torrent of words, the film feels claustrophobic, prolix and airless to the point of stupefaction ... Yet, whatever the film's overall problems, the role of Sophie, its beautiful, complex, worldly heroine, gives Meryl Streep the chance at bravura performance and she is, in a word, incandescent."

Boston Globe film critic Michael Blowen wrote, "Pakula's literal adaptation of Styron's Sophie's Choice is an admirable, if reverential, movie that crams this triangle into a -hour character study enriched by Meryl Streep and Kevin Kline, and nearly destroyed by Peter MacNicol."

Pauline Kael of The New Yorker wrote that it "is, I think, an infuriatingly bad movie ... The whole plot is based on a connection that isn't there—the connection between Sophie and Nathan's relationship and what the Nazis did to the Jews. Eventually, we get to the Mystery — to Sophie's Choice — and discover that the incident is garish rather than illuminating, and too particular to demonstrate anything general".

Streep's characterization was voted the third-greatest movie performance of all time by Premiere magazine. The film was also ranked number one in Roger Ebert's Top Ten List for 1982 and was listed on AFI's 100 Years... 100 Movies (10th Anniversary Edition) at number 91.

Accolades

See also
 1982 in film
 List of Holocaust films

Notes

References

Bibliography

External links

 
 
 

1980s English-language films
1980s German-language films
1980s Polish-language films
1980s American films
1980s British films
1982 films
1982 drama films
1982 multilingual films
American drama films
American multilingual films
British drama films
Films directed by Alan J. Pakula
Films scored by Marvin Hamlisch
Films based on American novels
Films about Nazism
Films about the aftermath of the Holocaust
Films set in Brooklyn
Films set in 1947
Films shot in Croatia
ITC Entertainment films
Films featuring a Best Actress Academy Award-winning performance
Films featuring a Best Drama Actress Golden Globe-winning performance